Schistura orthocauda is a species of ray-finned fish, a stone loach, in the genus Schistura from Vietnam.

References

O
Fish described in 1978